Lieutenant David John Weston  (born 14 November 1898, date of death unknown) was a British World War I flying ace credited with thirteen aerial victories. All of his wins were over enemy fighter planes.

Military service
Weston was commissioned 12 August 1917. He joined 20 Squadron at about the same time, late 1917. Weston scored his victories with either one of two observer aces—Walter Noble or Ernest Deighton—manning the guns in the rear seat. Weston and Noble scored a double victory on 25 January 1918 to begin both their victory rolls. Weston later scored triple victories on 19 May 1918, with Deighton, and 30 June, again with Noble; his last triumph was on 2 July, when he destroyed a Fokker D.VII over the Gheluvelt-Menen Road. His final tally was seven enemy fighter planes destroyed, and six driven down out of control. He was awarded the Distinguished Flying Cross for his actions, which was gazetted 3 August 1918.

Honors and awards
Distinguished Flying Cross (DFC)

Lt. David John Weston.
   
A bold and skilful airman, who has accounted for six enemy machines.
   
He has been generally engaged against superior numbers and always with success.

Notes

References
 

1898 births
Military personnel from London
Year of death missing
Royal Flying Corps officers
People from Wandsworth
British World War I flying aces
Recipients of the Distinguished Flying Cross (United Kingdom)